Johanna Mathilda Linsén (November 26, 1831, Helsinki - February 5, 1872), was a Finnish pedagogue. She is regarded as a pioneer within the education of the blind in Finland: she was the founder and principal of the first school for the blind in Finland in 1865-1872.

Life
Mathilda Linsén was the daughter of professor Johan Gabriel Linsen and Wilhelmina Petronella Hoeckert, and sister of the composer Gabriel Linsén. She was educated by her father and as an autodidact. By the help of Uno Cygnaeus, she was given state support to study the education of the blind in Germany and Scandinavia in 1863-64. In 1865, her rapport was published, and Finland's first school for the blind was founded in Helsinki, for which she was made principal. In 1867, she published another investigation on the subject.

References
 kansallisbiografia Suomen kansallisbiografia  (National Biography of Finland)

1831 births
1872 deaths
19th-century Finnish educators
Swedish-speaking Finns